Jesus exorcising a mute is the last of a series of miracles of Jesus recorded in chapter 9 of the Gospel of Matthew.

According to the Gospel of Matthew, just as the two blind men were healed by Jesus were going out, a man who was demon-possessed and could not talk was brought to Jesus. And when the demon was driven out, the man who had been mute spoke. The crowd was amazed and said, "Nothing like this has ever been seen in Israel". 

But the Pharisees said, "It is by the prince of demons that he drives out demons".

Commentary
This episode in the life of Christ is seen as a fulfillment of the prophecy of Isaiah (35:5): “Then shall the eyes of the blind be opened, and the ears of the deaf shall be unstopped, and the tongue of the dumb shall sing.”

Cornelius a Lapide notes that it appears that the demon made the man deaf and dumb, who was not naturally thus.
He also comments that these passages demonstrate different ranking among demons, as also among angels (some lower, some higher). So the higher orders who fell, "who were of a grander nature; for that which was theirs naturally remained in the devils after their fall."  He points out that even among rebel soldiers there are captains and generals. Because without these an army cannot be governed. As Lucifer is the prince of all the devils, so is St. Michael of all the angels (see Revelation 12). The different dispositions of the Pharisees compared to the multitude is worth note. The crowd, with simple candor, "magnified the miracles of Christ as done by a Divine Person, even the Messiah." However the Pharisees envied Christ, and were resentful of Him, saying he used a magic art.

See also

 Life of Jesus in the New Testament
 Ministry of Jesus
 Miracles of Jesus
 Parables of Jesus

References

Exorcisms of Jesus
Gospel of Matthew
Muteness